Christian Allard (born 31 March 1964) is a French-born British politician. Allard was elected as a Scottish National Party (SNP) Member of the European Parliament (MEP) for Scotland constituency in the 2019 European Parliament election, serving until the 31 January 2020 when the Brexit process was completed. He is also a former Member of the Scottish Parliament (MSP) for the North East Scotland region 2013−2016 and has been a councillor for Aberdeen City Council since 2017.

Background
Allard was born in 1964 in Dijon, France. He first came to Scotland around 1986, when he accepted the offer from a European seafood transport and logistics network (Tradimar/STEF) to open an office in Glasgow. After marrying a Scot, he later moved to the North East to work for a seafood exporting company. He worked in the fishing industry for over 30 years.

Political career
Allard joined the SNP around 2004. His belief that Scotland could and should be an independent country was shaped by his experiences in the fishing industry.

Allard worked part-time as a constituency assistant to Dennis Robertson MSP, and was a key part of Mr Robertson’s successful 2011 campaign team in Aberdeenshire West.

He succeeded Mark McDonald after he resigned his list seat to contest the 2013 Aberdeen Donside by-election.

His swearing into the Scottish Parliament was conducted in both English and French, the first time that the latter language has been used for the purpose.

Allard stood for re-election in 2016 and topped the SNP's regional list in the North East region. The SNP's dominated the constituency seats in the North East, with the regional seats going to candidates from the lists of other parties.

Allard stood for election at the 2017 Aberdeen City Council election for the Torry/Ferryhill ward and took the 3rd seat with 910 1st preference votes.

Allard was elected as a Member of the European Parliament for the Scotland constituency in the 2019 European Parliament election. He served as MEP until the 31 January 2020, when the Brexit process was completed.

At the 2021 Scottish Parliament election, he was the second list candidate for the SNP in the North East.

Personal life
Allard has raised three daughters in Scotland, and also now has four grandchildren.

See also
Alyn Smith
Aileen McLeod
Heather Anderson

References

External links 
 

1964 births
Living people
Politicians from Dijon
French emigrants to the United Kingdom
Politicians from Aberdeen
Scottish National Party MSPs
Members of the Scottish Parliament 2011–2016
Scottish National Party MEPs
MEPs for Scotland 2019–2020
Councillors in Aberdeen
Scottish National Party councillors